Jaded Era is an American alternative rock/pop band from Cuyahoga Falls and Akron, Ohio that formed around 1996 and later had their music released through Cage'em Records. They released their debut album Laugh at the World in 2001, and the albums Invisible and Study of the Human Race followed in 2003 and 2005, respectively. They first received significant attention in 2006 when pop rock singer-songwriter Ashlee Simpson covered "Invisible", the title track from Invisible. On the band's MySpace page, they cite The Kinks, No Doubt, Pearl Jam, The Pretenders, Queen and U2 as their influences.

Band Members 
Kira Leyden — lead vocals, guitar, keys
Jeff Andrea — lead guitar, vocals
Marco Hilj — bass
Eric Ortopan — drums

Discography

References

Drummer Eric Ortopan and Bassist Marco Hilj formed the band "The Blissfield Adrian" with Akron area singer songwriter Scott Hoyer in 2006

External links
Official MySpace page

Alternative rock groups from Ohio
Musical groups established in 1996
Musical groups from Akron, Ohio
People from Cuyahoga Falls, Ohio

Drummer Eric Ortopan is currently an 8th grade social studies teacher for Cuyahoga Falls and also coaches for a few soccer teams